Niels Hanssøn Meng (1604 – August 1676) was a Norwegian timber trader, property owner and civil leader.

Meng was born at Fredrikstad in Østfold, Norway. He was a leading timber merchant of the town, came to great wealth, and was the owner of dozens of farms. Around 1640, he settled in Halden  and increased his holdings in Båhuslen  and Follo.

About 1630, he came into public service, first in Nordre Viken, and from 1644 to 1655 as bailiff there and in Idd and Marker. In addition, he was royal customs officer at Halden and Svinesund. He was also judge and acting district governor of Smaalenenes (now Østfold).   Meng was the first Mayor of Fredrikshald, after it was given town privileges from 1665.

Through his marriage to Johanne Christensdatter (b. ca. 1615), he received significant properties in Båhuslen. He was the father of four daughters and included among his sons-in law,  Peder Olsen Normand (d. 1676) who was a merchant at Halden  and owner of  Holene in Idd.

References

1604 births
1676 deaths
People from Fredrikstad
People from Halden
Norwegian landowners
Norwegian businesspeople in timber
Norwegian civil servants
Norwegian merchants
County governors of Norway
Mayors of places in Østfold
17th-century Norwegian businesspeople